Hewens College (formerly Mellow Lane School) is a secondary school with academy status in Hayes, Hillingdon. It is part of the Rosedale Hewens Academy Trust The school caters for years 7–13, teaching KS3, KS4 and A Level.

Inspection judgements
Hewens College was inspected by Ofsted in 2012 and judged as 2 (Good). It was inspected again in 2015 and again judged Good.

The school in the news
In 2017 a Guardian investigation showed that the number of children in the GCSE cohort in 2015 had fallen by 46% from the number in that year group when they entered the school in year 7. Education Datalab reported that, had the GCSE results of the children who left Hewens College been included in the Hewens College results, these  would have been 16% lower for pupils achieving five GCSEs at grades A*-C including English and maths.

Notable former pupils 
Parmjit Dhanda, MP for Gloucester
Welsh international footballer Rhoys Wiggins
John Sissons (footballer)
Anne-Marie Duff, British Actress

References

External links
Hewens College website
 Archive pictures and documents on Mellow Lane
 Mellow Lane Girls Choir  in the 1950s

Academies in the London Borough of Hillingdon
Secondary schools in the London Borough of Hillingdon